The 2001 World Wushu Championships was the 6th edition of the World Wushu Championships. It was held at the Karen Demirchyan Sports and Concerts Complex in Yerevan, Armenia from October 31 to November 5, 2001.

Medal summary

Medal table

Men's taolu

Men's sanda

Women's taolu

References



World Wushu Championships
Wushu Championships
World Wushu Championships, 2001
2001 in wushu (sport)
Wushu in Armenia